Bally Assembly constituency is an assembly constituency in Howrah district in the Indian state of West Bengal.

Overview
As per orders of the Delimitation Commission, No. 169 Bally Assembly constituency is composed of Bally Municipality which is merged with Howrah Municipal Corporation now.

Bally Assembly constituency is part of No. 25 Howrah (Lok Sabha constituency).

Members of Legislative Assembly

Election results

2021
In the 2021 election, Dr. Rana Chatterjee of Trinamool Congress defeated by his nearest rival Baishali Dalmiya of BJP.

2016
In the 2016 election, Baishali Dalmiya of Trinamool Congress defeated her nearest rival Saumendranath Bera of CPI(M).

2011
In the 2011 election, Sultan Singh of Trinamool Congress defeated his nearest rival Kanika Ganguly of CPI(M).

 

.# Swing calculated on Congress+Trinamool Congress vote percentages taken together in 2011.

2006
In the 2006 election, Kanika Ganguly of CPI(M) defeated her nearest rival Rekha Raut of AITC.

 

.# Swing calculated on Trinamool Congress+BJP vote percentages taken together in 2006.

2001
In the 2001 election, Kanika Ganguly of CPI(M) defeated her nearest rival Supriyo Basu of INC.

 

.# Swing calculated on Trinamool Congress+Congress vote percentages taken together in 2001.

1977-2006
In the 2006, 2001 and 1996 state assembly elections, Kanika Ganguly of CPI(M) won the Bally assembly seat defeating her nearest rivals, Rekha Raut of Trinamool Congress in 2006, Supriyo Basu of Congress in 2001 and Bani Kumar Singha of Congress in 1996. Contests in most years were multi cornered but only winners and runners are being mentioned. Patit Paban Pathak of CPI(M) defeated Supriyo Basu of Congress in 1991. Supriyo Basu of Congress defeated Patit Paban Pathak of CPI(M) in 1987. Patit Paban Pathak defeated Bani Kumar Singha of Congress in 1982 and Ganesh Pathak of Congress in 1977.

1951-1971
Bhabani Shankar Mukherjee of Congress won in 1972. Patit Paban Pathak of CPI(M) won in 1971 and 1969. S.N.Mukherjee of Congress won in 1967. Shankar Lal Mukherjee of Congress won in 1962. Monilal Basu of Congress won in 1957. In independent India's first election in 1951, Ratan Moni Chattopadhyay of Congress won the Bally seat.

References

Assembly constituencies of West Bengal
Politics of Howrah district
1952 establishments in West Bengal
Constituencies established in 1952